Dean Malcolm Barkley (born August 31, 1950) is an American attorney and politician who briefly served as a United States Senator from Minnesota from 2002 to 2003 as a member of the Independence Party of Minnesota. The founder and chair of the Minnesota Reform Party (later renamed the Independence Party), he was the chairman of Jesse Ventura's successful upset bid for governor of Minnesota in 1998. Ventura subsequently appointed him director of the state's Office of Strategic and Long Range Planning. After Senator Paul Wellstone died in a plane crash just weeks before the 2002 election, Ventura appointed Barkley to fill Wellstone's Senate seat. His brief tenure ended when Republican Norm Coleman was elected and sworn in to fill the seat.  

Barkley has run for office four times. Inspired by Ross Perot's 1992 presidential campaign, he first ran for Congress as an independent in that year's election in Minnesota's 6th congressional district, but lost. He unsuccessfully ran three times for the U.S. Senate: in Minnesota’s 1994 Senate election, in 1996, and in 2008. He received 5%, 7%, and 15% of the vote in each election, respectively.

Early life, education, and early career
Barkley was born in Annandale, Minnesota, on August 31, 1950, and graduated from Annandale High School in 1968. He earned a Bachelor of Arts from the University of Minnesota in 1972 and a Juris Doctor from the University of Minnesota Law School in 1976. During his university years, Barkley volunteered for George McGovern's 1972 presidential campaign because of his opposition to the Vietnam War.

Career
After graduating from law school, he practiced law and in 1988 became president of Dayton's Furniture in Annandale, a position he held until 1991.

A founder of the Minnesota Reform Party, Barkley ran for the U.S. House in 1992, a run inspired by Ross Perot's presidential campaign, and received 16% of the vote, thanks in part to Perot voters. He was also a candidate for the U.S. Senate in 1994 and 1996.

Ventura administration and the United States Senate

Barkley was chairman of Jesse Ventura's successful gubernatorial campaign in 1998. In January 1999, Ventura appointed Barkley as director of the Office of Strategic and Long Range Planning (known as Minnesota Planning).

On November 4, 2002, Ventura appointed Barkley to complete the Senate term of Paul Wellstone, who died in a plane crash on October 25. The appointment was announced during the Senate debate between Republican Norm Coleman and Democrat Walter Mondale, who had taken Wellstone's place on the ballot; Ventura intended to upstage the debate. Barkley served until the 107th United States Congress ended on January 3, 2003, when he was replaced by Coleman, who won the election. Ventura had previously stated that he would not appoint a replacement for Wellstone, but said he changed his mind out of disgust at Wellstone's memorial service, which he felt was used as a rally for the Democratic Party, and because the major parties refused to take the third-party senatorial candidate seriously or to allow him to participate in the debates.

During his weeks as senator, Barkley helped pass legislation establishing a memorial for Wellstone and provided a pivotal vote in clearing the final passage of the Homeland Security Act.

After Ventura administration
After leaving office, Barkley did a stint in St. Paul as a state government lobbyist for a tobacco company, a casino, and the private prison industry. Beginning in April 2005, Barkley served as director and chief strategist for Texas Independent Kinky Friedman's 2006 gubernatorial campaign.

In a June 2007 interview with Minnesota Monitor, Barkley confirmed that he had been approached by Democrats in Minnesota's 6th congressional district about a possible challenge to Republican Rep. Michele Bachmann. Barkley indicated he would consider running if the DFL would support him as an independent candidate.

As of May 2008 Barkley was working part-time as a bus driver for the elderly and disabled. He said he enjoyed the job and saw it as a public service.

2008 U.S. Senate campaign

Both Barkley and Ventura considered challenging Norm Coleman for reelection to the U.S. Senate seat that Barkley previously held. On July 14, 2008, Ventura announced that he would not seek the seat, prompting Barkley to announce his candidacy. Ventura supported Barkley and donated $500 to the campaign.

Despite entering the race late, Barkley was polling as high as 19% by October 1. The campaign also produced two statewide radio ads featuring Barkley and Ventura. Barkley, unlike many third-party and independent candidates, was included in public debates with the major party nominees; the first of five three-way debates took place October 5. He received the endorsement of former U.S. Representative Tim Penny. Numerous polls showed that Barkley would affect the outcome of the race. Barkley raised $163,358 for his campaign (less than 1% of each of his opponents' totals). He received over 435,000 votes, about 15% of the total, significantly affecting a race in which Franken defeated Coleman by only 312 votes.

2012 Minnesota Supreme Court campaign
Barkley ran against Minnesota Supreme Court Associate Justice G. Barry Anderson in the 2012 election. Anderson was appointed to the court by Governor Tim Pawlenty in 2004, was elected to a six-year term in 2006, and was reelected in 2012.

Post-political career

Barkley returned to law practice in Bloomington, with a general practice.

Papers

Dean Barkley's senatorial papers are in the library of the Minnesota Historical Society. They include biographical files, press releases and speeches, legislative files, and issue mail.

Electoral history

References

External links
Biography at the Biographical Directory of the United States Congress
 

United States senators from Minnesota
State cabinet secretaries of Minnesota
1950 births
Living people
People from Wright County, Minnesota
University of Minnesota Law School alumni
Independence Party of Minnesota politicians
21st-century American politicians
Candidates in the 2008 United States elections
Candidates in the 2012 United States elections
Minnesota lawyers